Australoporus is a fungal genus in the family Polyporaceae. It is a monotypic genus, containing the single species Australoporus tasmanicus, found in Tasmania. The genus was circumscribed in 1988 by mycologists Peter Buchanan and Leif Ryvarden to contain the species then known as Polyporus tasmanicus.

References

External links

Fungi native to Australia
Polyporaceae
Monotypic Polyporales genera
Taxa described in 1988
Taxa named by Leif Ryvarden